Ceratophora is a genus of agamid lizards found in Sri Lanka. The male has a horn on its snout.

Description 
The tympanum is hidden, and the body is more or less laterally compressed, and covered with unequal scales. No dorsal crest is present; and a nuchal crest can be present or absent. No gular sac or gular fold is present. A large rostral appendage occurs, at least in the males.   No femoral or preanal pores are found.

Species 
The following species are recognized as being valid.

Key to selected species 
a. Gular scales larger than the ventrals, smooth; lateral scales large, unequal; rostral appendage scaleless — C. stoddartii
b. Gular scales larger than the ventrals, feebly keeled; lateral scales large, equal;  rostral appendage scaly — C. tennentii
c. Gular scales smaller than the ventrals, strongly keeled; lateral scales small; rostral appendage scaly — C. aspera

References

Further reading 
 Boulenger GA. 1885. Catalogue of the Lizards in the British Museum (Natural History). Second Edition. Volume I. ... Agamidæ. London: Trustees of the British Museum (Natural History). (Taylor & Francis, printers). xii + 436 pp. + Plates I-XXXII. (Genus Ceratophora, p. 277).
 Gray JE. 1835. Illustrations of Indian Zoology; Chiefly Selected from the Collection of Major-General Hardwicke. Vol. II. London: Adolphus Richter. (Stirling, printer). 102 plates. (Ceratophora stoddartii, Plate 68, Figure 2).
 Gray JE. 1845. Catalogue of the Specimens of Lizards in the Collection of the British Museum. London: Trustees of the British Museum. (Edward Newman, printer). xxviii + 289 pp. (Genus Ceratophora, p. 237).
 Günther ACLG. 1864. The Reptiles of British India. London: The Ray Society. (Taylor and Francis, printers). xxvii + 452 pp. + Plates I-XXVI. (Genus Ceratophora, p. 129).
 Smith MA. 1935. The Fauna of British India, Including Ceylon and Burma. Reptilia and Amphibia. Vol. II.—Sauria. London: Secretary of State for India in Council. (Taylor and Francis, printers). xiii + 440 pp. + Plate I + 2 maps. (Genus Ceratophora, pp. 151–152).

External links

 
 

 
Lizard genera
Taxa named by John Edward Gray